Tricks Of The Trade, Vol. II: The Money Is Made is the second album by Detroit rap group Detroit's Most Wanted released on April 6, 1992. It is their most successful album as it has peaked at #58 on the Billboard Top R&B Albums Chart. The Money Is Made and Pop The Trunk were released as singles. A music video was made for the song The Money Is Made which was the first rap video to ever be filmed at a casino as it was shot on location at Atlantic City, New Jersey.

Special Anniversary Edition
In 2004, the album was re-released as a 2-disc set which contained an updated version of the cover as well as a separate disc of all new songs. The late rapper Proof from D-12 appears on two songs in this disc.

Track listing
 Intro 
 Pop The Trunk
 The Setup
 The Money Is Made 
 The Retaliation 
 Tricks Of The Trade Pt. II
 Rape (Scene I) 
 Put The Suckers To Sleep 
 Backstabber
 Rape (Scene II) 
 The City Of Boom (Remix) 
 A.P.B. (That's The Name Of The Click) 
 All About Ya Yo 
 To The Real Ones 
 That Funky Stuff

2004 Special Anniversary Edition bonus disc track listing
 Guess Who's Back
 Life On The Streets  
 We Here We Ain't Never Left 
 Dry Your Eyes (Featuring Eddie Stubbles) 
 My Old Man 
 Civil War (Featuring Proof, Big Dogg, & T-Stuck) 
 Ain't No Punk In Me  
 4 Fathers (Featuring Proof, Big Dogg, & T-Stuck) 
 Last Don (Featuring Eddie Stubbles)

References

1992 albums
Sequel albums
Detroit's Most Wanted albums